Majid Farzin is an Iranian powerlifter and has a Guinness World Record in Powerlifting in 2017. At the 2012 Summer Paralympics he won gold medal at the -82.5 kg category, with 237 kg.

See also 
 Powerlifting at the 2008 Summer Paralympics – Men's 75 kg

References 

Paralympic gold medalists for Iran
Paralympic powerlifters of Iran
Powerlifters at the 2012 Summer Paralympics
Living people
Medalists at the 2012 Summer Paralympics
People from Ardabil Province
Medalists at the 2008 Summer Paralympics
Paralympic silver medalists for Iran
Iranian powerlifters
Year of birth missing (living people)
Paralympic medalists in powerlifting
21st-century Iranian people